"Left Alone" is a jazz song written by singer Billie Holiday and pianist/composer Mal Waldron, and published by E.B. Marks.

Background
This is one of seven songs written by or co-written by Holiday that she never recorded.

Mal Waldron began working as pianist for Holiday in mid-1953. Holiday had intended to record the song a number of times but "always forget the damned sheet music." However, Waldron himself recorded the song on his 1959 album Left Alone, and near the end of the LP discusses the origin of the song.

Recordings
Waldron frequently performed the song for albums, often with tenor saxophonist Johnny Griffin (who also played on the Left Alone album). Version are included in Mal: Live 4 to 1 (1971), Like Old Times (1976), Left Alone '86 (1986), Into the Light (1989), My Dear Family (1993), and Left Alone Revisited (2002).

Other jazz performers who've recorded the song include: 
 Abbey Lincoln – Straight Ahead (with Waldron on piano, 1961)
 Johnny Griffin – White Gardenia (1961).
 Jeanne Lee and Ran Blake – The Newest Sound Around (1962)
 Eric Dolphy and Booker Little – Far Cry (1962)
 Kimiko Kasai – One For Lady (with Waldron on piano, 1971)
 Archie Shepp and Dollar Brand – Duet (1978)
 Abraham Burton – Closest to the Sun (1994)
 Jackie McLean and Junko Onishi – Hat Trick (1996)
 Steve Kuhn – Plays Standards (2009)
 Tsuyoshi Yamamoto – Gentle Blues (2013)
 Jane Ira Bloom - Sixteen Sunsets (2013)

An instrumental version of the song appeared on Joe Satriani's Time Machine in 1993. The Satriani version, titled "All Alone", was released as a single, reached No. 21 on Billboard'''s Mainstream Rock chart and received a nomination for Best Rock Instrumental Performance at the 1995 Grammy Awards.

Notes

References
Stuart Nicholson, Billie Holiday'', 
Billie Holiday, THE BEST OF BILLIE HOLIDAY: Songs Recorded and Made Famous By Lady Day. Hal Leonard Corporation. .  
Donald Clarke, Wishing On the Moon. Viking. .
John Chilton, Billie's Blues. Da Capo Preess. 
John White, Billie Holiday: Her Life and Times 
Mal Waldron, Left Alone LP Liner Notes ASIN: B00004YR36
Amazon.com Editorial Review for Mal Waldron CD Left Alone
Ken Vail, Lady Day's Diary. Sanctuary Publishing. 

Compositions by Mal Waldron
Songs written by Billie Holiday
1953 songs